Kirschbaum is the German word for cherry tree, and also a surname. It may refer to:

People
Bill Kirschbaum (1902–1953), U.S. Olympic swimmer
Carl Ludwig Kirschbaum (1812–1880), German entomologist, professor of biology, and museum director
Charlotte von Kirschbaum (1899–1975), German theologian
Eliezer Simon Kirschbaum (1797–1860), Austrian physician and writer
Thorsten Kirschbaum (born 1987), German football player
Walter Kirschbaum ( mid-20th century), West German slalom canoer

Other
Japigny kirschbaum, a species of glass knifefish

See also
 Kirschenbaum (surname)

German-language surnames
Jewish surnames